
Gmina Nowe Miasto Lubawskie is a rural gmina (administrative district) in Nowe Miasto County, Warmian-Masurian Voivodeship, in northern Poland.

Villages
Gmina Nowe Miasto Lubawskie contains the villages and settlements of Bagno, Bratian, Chrośle, Gryźliny, Gwiździny, Jamielnik, Kaczek, Łąki Bratiańskie, Lekarty, Mszanowo, Nawra, Nowy Dwór Bratiański, Pacółtowo, Pustki, Radomno, Skarlin and Tylice.

Neighbouring gminas
Gmina Nowe Miasto Lubawskie is bordered by the town of Nowe Miasto Lubawskie and by the gminas of Biskupiec, Grodziczno, Iława, Kurzętnik and Lubawa.

References

Polish official population figures 2006

Nowe Miasto Lubawskie
Nowe Miasto County